The Tandem Repeats Database (TRDB) is a database of tandem repeats in genomic DNA.

See also
 Tandem repeats

References

External links
 https://tandem.bu.edu/cgi-bin/trdb/trdb.exe

Genetics databases
Repetitive DNA sequences